Ricotia is a genus of flowering plants in the family Brassicaceae, found in the Aegean islands, Crete, the Levant, the Sinai peninsula, Turkey, and the Transcaucasus. They appear to have arisen in Anatolia, to which five species are endemic.

Species
Currently accepted species include:

Ricotia aucheri (Boiss.) B.L.Burtt
Ricotia carnosula Boiss. & Heldr.
Ricotia cretica Boiss. & Heldr.
Ricotia davisiana B.L.Burtt
Ricotia isatoides (Barbey) B.L.Burtt
Ricotia lunaria (L.) DC.
Ricotia sinuata Boiss. & Heldr.
Ricotia tenuifolia Sm.
Ricotia varians B.L.Burtt

References

Brassicaceae
Brassicaceae genera